Gaylussacia tomentosa, commonly known as the hairy dangleberry or hairytwig huckleberry, is a plant species native to the coastal plains of the southeastern United States (Alabama, Georgia, Florida, the Carolinas).

Asa Gray described this species as Vaccinium tomentosum in 1878. It was given its current name in 1897.

Gaylussacia tomentosa is a shrub up to 200 cm (80 inches) tall, spreading by means of underground rhizomes hence sometimes forming huge colonies. Leaves are dull green or yellow-green on the upper surface, pale green and waxy on the underside. Flowers are in dangling groups of 2–4, greenish-white. Fruits are dark blue or occasionally white, sweet and juicy.

References

tomentosa
Flora of the Southeastern United States
Flora of the Southern United States
Berries
Plants described in 1878
Taxa named by Asa Gray
Taxa named by Frederick Traugott Pursh
Taxa named by John Kunkel Small